Dancing England was a series of showcase traditional dance concerts held at the Derby Assembly Rooms from 1979 to 1987. They were devised and curated by Phil Heaton and John Shaw, members of the Black Cap Sword Dancers, and two very notable characters on the Nottingham and Derby folk and dance scene of the 1970s. Dancing England was set up to showcase the best of traditional dance in the UK, along with unique and/or interesting folk customs to celebrate the UK's wide cultural heritage.

Dancing England gone by

In 1979 Phil and John of Black Cap decided to hold a 'Feast' and invite the best dancers from across the UK as their guests, and so the idea of Dancing England was born.

The event was held in the evening and consisted of a series of performances by dance teams across all the styles of UK traditional dance; Cotswold Morris, Rapper sword, Longsword, North West, step clog dancing, Border, Molly, and much more. There were also performances by mummers and Pace Eggers, musicians and from some of the more idiosyncratic traditional teams; notably The Britannia Coconut Dancers, Abbots Bromley Horn Dancers and the Whittlesey Straw Bear. There were stalls selling music, ephemera and crafts, films, workshops and talks. The event was refreshed with plenty of real ale, and finished with a ceilidh late at night.

Notable teams from 1979 to 1987

1979 - Abbots Bromley Horn Dancers, Britannia Coconut Dancers, Handsworth Longsword, Monkseaton Morrismen (Rapper), Minehead Hobby 'Oss, Shropshire Bedlams, Bampton Cotswold Morris Men, Manley Morris Dancers, Winster Morris, Peter Brown (Step Dancing), Roy Dyson (caller)
1980 - Abbots Bromley Horn Dancers, Britannia Coconut Dancers, Mepal Molly Dancers, Grenoside Longsword, Colne Royal Morris, Silurian Border Morris, Winster Morris, Chipping Campden Morris, Old Ball, Royal Earsdon Sword, Doris Hawkes (Clog dancing) Ram's Bottom Blood Tubs, Tony Mannion (hornpipe & step dance)
1981 - The Artichoke Pipe Dance, Kingsmen Rapper Sword, Horwich Prize Medal Morris, Cambridge Molly Men, Redcar Longsword, Jane Flett & Lindsay Smith, Winster Morris, Abingdon Morris, Haxey Hood, Jane Flett& Lindsay Smith (stepdance), Cyril Papworth (Broomdance), Monkseaton Country Dancers, Monkseaton Egg Dancers, Cambridge Molly Men, Silurian Border Morris,
1982 - Whittlesey Straw Bear, The Iron Men, Loftus Longsword, Fidler's Fancy Morris, Headington Quarry Morris, High Spen Rapper, Harper's Frolick Dancers, Winster Morris, Antrobus Soulcakers, Leyland N.W. Morris, Grovely Faggot, Lichfield Greenhill Bower & Green Man's Morris, Monkseaton Morrismen (Rapper)
1983 - Bampton Morris Men, Bob Cann and Sally Hooper - Devon Step Dancers, Brant Broughton Lincolnshire Plough Boys, Cam Kernewek Cornish Dancers, Flamborough Longsword Dancers, Fred Forster's High Spen Rapper, Grovelly Faggott Dancers of Wiltshire, Lymm and Statham Morris, Poynton Jemmers Cheshire Morris, Shropshire Bedlams Welsh Border Morris, Snap the Dragon from Norwich, Tideswell Town Band Processional Morris, Winster Derbyshire Morris and Woodfidley Playford Dancers
1984 - Eynsham Morris, Wooden Horse from Kent, East Yorkshire Vessel Cuppers, Midgeley Pace Eggers, Pat Tracey, Rochester Dancing Sweeps, Royal Earsdon Rapper
1985 - The Salisbury Giant, Lichfield Morris, Goathland Plough Stots, East Sussex Frailers, Breinton Border Morris, Nottingham Butchers, The Throstles Nest
1986 - Aidleys Morris, Bampton Morris Men, Bob Cann & Sally Hooper, Cam Kernewek Cornish Dancers, Flamborough Longsword Dancers, Poynton Jemmers, Grovelly Faggot Dancers
1987 - Abbotts Bromley Horn Dancers, Fidler's Fancy, Pyewackett, Straw Bear, Hugh Rippon, Iron Men and Severn Guilders, Gorton Morris, Grenoside Longsword, Chipping Campden Morris, Mepal Molly Men, Winster Morris, The Old Hat Band, Peter Brown, Bryan Jackson, The Flett Sisters and East Anglian Step Dancers

Daughter of Dancing England

After Dancing England came to an end in 1987, there was a brief reprise in 1993 at the same venue for the Daughter of Dancing England event. This only ran for one year, and both Dancing England and Daughter of same were sadly missed.

The Dancing England Rapper Tournament (DERT)

Dancing England featured a rapper sword competition in the afternoon prior to the evening concert, in homage to the Newcastle Tournament of Music and Art which was held in the city from just after the Great War until the 1950s. Following the sad demise of Dancing England in 1987, the competition continued under the name of DERT and now travels around the country being hosted by a different rapper sword team every year.

The modern Dancing England Series, 2017 onwards

2019 - Nottingham Playhouse; Saturday 26 January 2019

2017 - Sheffield City Hall; Saturday 18 February 2017.

References

External links
 Dancing England website The Reboot
 Phil Heaton Phil Heaton's EFDSS Gold Medal citation
 The NUT The DERT Years
 Lichfield Morrismen Lichfield Morrismen at Dancing England 1984
 Whittlesey Straw Bear The Bear at Dancing Englands 1982 and 1987
 Wakefield Morris Wakefield Morris reference Dancing England
 East Yorkshire Vessel Cuppers Dancing England reference by Ted Dodsworth
 Eynsham Morris Dancing England reference for the 1980s

Folk dance
Folklore